Salbari College (Bodo: सालबारि कलेज) is a self-financed institute affiliated to Gauhati University in India. It offers Bachelor of Arts.

History
Salbari College was established on 14 November 1983 on its own land at the initiative of the conscious educationist and guardians of the locality with mere public donations amidst their poor socio- economic conditions prevailing at that time. The College is located at the heart of newly constructed Salbari Sub-Division and stadium (Near Udhiaguri) in the District of Baksa (Erstwhile Barpeta) in Bodoland Territorial Council of Assam, and adjacent to the world Heritage site Manas National Park. It is about 10 km south from the Indo-Bhutan Border and 25 km north from the No.31 National Highway. It has a campus of 42 Bighas(Approx) land, in which required infrastructure is developing to provide an excellent environment for quality education and knowledge enhancement.

Mission
Salbari College was established at Salbari on 14 November 1983 with a view to removing educational backwardness, providing accessibility to higher education for women, imparting education leading to the inculcation of a scientific temperament among the rural masses and giving a standing to the social needs and relevant assistance to the people of Salbari and its adjoining area.

Academic
Bachelor of Arts
B.A. in Bodo
 B.A in Assamese
 B.A in English
 B.A in philosophy
 B.A in economics
 B.A in history
 B.A in political science
 B.A in philosophy

 Master of Arts Distance learning
 M.A in Assamese
 M.A. in Bodo
 M.A. in English
 M.A. in History
 M.A. in Economics
 M.A. in Bengali
 M.A. in philosophy
 M.A./M.Sc in Mathematics
 M. Com
Besides it offers Masters in communication and journalism (MCJ/PGDJMC), PG Diploma in Sales and Marketing Management (PGDSMM), PG Diploma in Business Management (PGDBM), PG Diploma in Finance Management (PGDFM), PG Diploma in Insurance and Risk Management PGDIM), PG Diploma in Banking and Finance Services (PGDBFS) and PG Diploma in Computer Application (PGDCA). Prospectus for these courses can be obtained from its co-ordinator, Sri Dulen Basumatary( Associate Prof.), Department of History, Salbari college

References

Universities and colleges in Assam
Colleges affiliated to Gauhati University
Educational institutions established in 1983
1983 establishments in Assam